Podtabor (locally Podtaber) is a small settlement north of Ilirska Bistrica in the Inner Carniola region of Slovenia.

References

External links
Podtabor on Geopedia

Populated places in the Municipality of Ilirska Bistrica